Brian O'Connell (born 1982) is a retired Irish sportsman. He played hurling and football with his local club Wolfe Tones na Sionna and represented the Clare senior hurling team from 2003 to 2010. O'Connell captained this team for three years including a Munster final appearance against Tipperary in 2008. O'Connell is better known as 'BOC'. He was a valuable part of the Wolfe Tones team which defeated Newmarket on Fergus to claim its second senior county hurling title in 2006.

He was named "Hurler of the Month" for June 2008 and was shortlisted for the hurling All-Stars at the end of the 2008 season.

Brian emigrated to Melbourne, Australia, citing a lack of work in Ireland and become one of the first high-profile hurlers to leave due to work commitments. Brian was in the height of his playing career however years of representing his club and county at dual sport and numerous age levels took its toll.  Brian struggled with a number of back and hand injuries during 2010 which hampered his participation during the campaign.

Brian returned to Ireland in 2012 joining up with Clare once again under the guidance of Davy Fitzgerald. A number of injuries including a tear to his right rectus femoris and ongoing hip problems forced Brian to leave the panel in early 2013. Clare of course went on to win the All-Ireland Senior hurling championship in this year leaving Brian to think of what might have been.

Brian is currently a selector for Wolfe Tones na Sionna senior hurlers and is a public advocate for seeking change to current club structure in Ireland.

References

Clare inter-county hurlers
Wolfe Tones na Sionna hurlers
1984 births
Living people